Hellville de Luxe is the fifth studio album recorded by Spanish singer-songwriter Enrique Bunbury released on October 7, 2008 in three formats; Vinyl, CD and Digital audio. The album was produced by Phil Manzanera, remixed in the Music Lan studios in Avinyonet de Puigventós and mastered in Sterling Sound in New York City.

Track listing
All songs written by Enrique Bunbury.
This information adapted from Allmusic.

Certifications

References

2008 albums
Spanish-language albums
Enrique Bunbury albums